The Massachusetts Board of Library Commissioners (est.1890) is a state agency that supports libraries in Massachusetts. The governor appoints each commissioner. The current board consists of librarians, academics and library trustees: Carol B. Caro, Mary Ann Cluggish, George T. Comeau, Mary Kronholm, Frank Murphy, Roland Ochsenbein, Janine Resnik, Gregory J. Shesko, and Alice M. Welch.

History

The agency originated as the Massachusetts Free Public Library Commission "to encourage the establishment of libraries by direct aid and to give advice relating to the maintenance and administration of libraries" in Massachusetts. It was the first of its kind in the United States. In 1890, the board consisted of Caleb Benjamin Tillinghast, Samuel Swett Green, Henry Stedman Nourse, Elizabeth Putnam Sohier, and Anna E. Ticknor. Elizabeth Putnam Sohier and Anna Eliot Ticknor became the first women appointed to a United States state library agency when they were appointed to the agency in 1890. Other early members of the commission included Mabel Simpkins Agassiz, Anna Sears Amory, Deloraine P. Corey.

In its first years of existence, the board accomplished significant fulfillment of its mission. In 1890 "105 towns in the Commonwealth were without a free public library. Twenty years later, in 1910, every city and town, with one exception, had a library of its own."

The name of the agency changed in 1952 from the "Massachusetts Board of Free Public Library Commissioners" to the "Massachusetts Board of Library Commissioners." As of the 1990s it was "responsible for library development and resource sharing." As of 2010, "the Massachusetts Board of Library Commissioners is the agency of state government with the statutory authority and responsibility to organize, develop, coordinate and improve library services throughout the Commonwealth. The Board also strives to provide every resident of the Commonwealth with full and equal access to library information resources regardless of geographic location, social or economic status, age, level of physical or intellectual ability, or cultural background." It operates from offices in Boston's North End.

See also

 Massachusetts Library System, funded by MBLC
 . (Various documents).
 List of public libraries in Massachusetts
 Public library movement

References

Further reading

Issued by the Commission
 Annual reports. v.1-8 (1891-1898); v.9 (1899); v.10-18 (1900-1908); v.19-24 (1909-1914); v.25-27 (1915-1917); v.28-51 (1918-1940); 1998-present.
 C.B. Tillinghast. The free public libraries of Massachusetts. 1891. 
 General library legislation of Massachusetts, [1798-1890]. ca.1891. 
 Henry Stedman Nourse, ed. Free public libraries of Massachusetts. 9th Report of the Free Public Library Commission of Massachusetts. Boston: Wright & Potter, 1899. Google books
 Zaidee Brown.  Directions for the librarian of a small library, rev. ed. 1911. 
 John Foster Carr. What the library can do for our foreign-born. 1913
 Alice G. Chandler. Country library versus the donor and the architect. Boston: 1915.
 Jane Maud Campbell. Selected list of Russian books. Compiled for the Massachusetts Free Public Library Commission. American Library Association Publishing Board, 1916. 
 Free public library buildings of Massachusetts: a roll of honor, 1918. Boston: Wright & Potter, 1919

About the Commission
 "Books for the masses: success of free libraries in Massachusetts; their establishment encouraged by gift of money from the state - only 53 towns unprovided - work of the Free Library Commission." New York Times, Jan. 30, 1893
 Thurston Taylor. Review of Verschoor and Bundy's Regional Library Systems Development in Massachusetts: A Report of an Investigation with Recommendations (Boston: Massachusetts Division of Library Extension, 1963). In: Library Quarterly, Vol. 35, No. 1 (Jan., 1965), pp. 68–69.
 Patricia Nealon. Libraries welcome release of state funds; cramped, aging facilities await work. Boston Globe, Aug 26, 1990. pg. 1
 Sandy Coleman. Underfunded libraries losing grants Unable to meet state budget standards, towns face decertification and loss of aid.  Boston Globe, Feb 16, 1992. pg. 1
 Alison O'Leary Murray. Libraries await decisions by state board. Boston Globe, Jan 28, 2007. pg. 4
 Kathleen Burge. State's grants elude libraries; Some did, some couldn't; Communities find matching funds are casualties of recession economy. Boston Globe, Nov 18, 2010. pg. 1

External links
 . (Various documents).

1890 establishments in Massachusetts
History of Massachusetts
Public libraries in Massachusetts
State agencies of Massachusetts
Organizations established in 1890